The Recipe (literally "Soybean paste") is a 2010 South Korean film about a television producer who finds out many surprising truths while tracking down the story about a mysterious bean paste stew. Behind the captivating taste lies a woman’s unfortunate life and love story.

Plot
Jang Hye-jin (Lee Yo-won) is an ordinary woman whose doenjang jjigae (soybean paste soup) is to die for but only very few have tried it. They claimed the scent alone was so heavenly it was as if all around didn't matter.

When a notorious murderer on death row requests Jang’s soup as his last meal, television producer Choi Yoo-jin (Ryu Seung-ryong) starts looking for Jang and the recipe. While looking, Chou Yoo-jin discovers how police were only able to catch the killer due to him walking into a kitchen with the doenjang jjigae cooking. The killer was so captivated by the stew he didn't even notice the police arriving to arrest him. The scent also froze the police until a chill breeze blew it away. They waited for the killer to finish before arresting but wondered what it must have tasted like.

Jang is nowhere to be found and upon Choi's journey he learns she died while searching for her love, Kim Hyun-soo (Lee Dong-wook) but hopes to discover the recipe.

Cast

 Ryu Seung-ryong as Choi Yoo-jin
 Lee Yo-won as Jang Hye-jin
 Lee Dong-wook as Kim Hyun-soo
 Jo Sung-ha as Park Min / Park Gu
 Lee Yong-nyeo as Han Myung-suk 
Owner of mountainside restaurant

 Kim Jung-suk as Detective Kang
 Yu Seung-mok as Kim Deuk-gu
 Nam Jeong-hee
Grandmother

 Kim Se-dong
Blind man

 Park Hye-jin
Owner of Soondae Soup restaurant

 Yoo Soon-woong
Salt farm owner

 Lee Sang-hee
Owner of small store in the countryside

Production
Twelve years after her last film, Rub Love, director Anna Lee mixes two different genres - the thriller and the love story. The English title, The Recipe, contains a lot of meaning: a record of a person’s life, a memory of taste, an experience of loss and a chronicle of hurts. In this sense, the film is a recipe for everything. Lee illustrates the obsession with memories of love and a fatalistic point of view. The soybean soup recipe contains pain, longing and salvation. In a sense, the recipe is the very history of Korea’s memory and tradition.

References

External links
 The Recipe at Naver 
 
 
 

South Korean crime drama films
2010 films
2010s crime drama films
2010 drama films
2010s South Korean films